Dilane Roese (born 15 September 1977) is a Brazilian former handball player. She competed in the women's tournament at the 2000 Summer Olympics.

References

External links
 

1977 births
Living people
Brazilian female handball players
Olympic handball players of Brazil
Handball players at the 2000 Summer Olympics
People from Novo Hamburgo
Sportspeople from Rio Grande do Sul
Handball players at the 1999 Pan American Games
Pan American Games gold medalists for Brazil
Pan American Games medalists in handball
Medalists at the 1999 Pan American Games
21st-century Brazilian women